The 2013 MNL-2 New Holland League is the inaugural MNL-2 season which began on 15 February and ended on 28 June. 
On 28 June 2013, Chin United defeated GFA FC to become the first ever MNL-2 Champions.

To MNL-2

Promoted from Amateur League

 Myawady FC

Relegated from MNL

 Chin United FC
 Mawyawadi FC

From MNL-2

Promoted to MNL

 Chin United
 GFA FC

Relegation

It is understood that MFF is in the process of establishing a third-tier league, MNL-3 in coming years. Until then no team will be relegated.

Teams

The 2013 MNL-2 season will have 9 teams playing for promotion to the Myanmar National League. The teams are:-

 Best United FC
 Horizon FC
 Mawyawadi FC
 Chin United
 Myawady FC
 GFA FC
 Myanmar U-19 (guest team)
 Dagon FC
 Michelia FC

Stadium 
Matches are planned to play in Bogyoke Aung San Stadium and Padonmar Stadium with a League cup format.

League table

See also
 2013 Myanmar National League
 2013 MFF Cup

References

External links
Myanmar Football Federation:MNL-2
Myanmar Football Federation:Amateur League
Myanmar National League:MNL-2 Table
Soccer Myanmar

MNL-2 seasons
2
Burma
Burma